Valaris plc (previously ENSCO-Rowan plc) is an offshore drilling contractor headquartered in Houston, Texas, and incorporated in the UK. It is the largest offshore drilling and well drilling company in the world, and owns 56 rigs, including 40 offshore jackup rigs, 11 drillships, and 5 semi-submersible platform drilling rigs.

In 2021, the company's largest customers were BP (11% of revenues) and Total S.A. (9% of revenues).

History
In 1975, after the 1973 oil crisis, John R. Blocker bought Choya Energy, a six-rig contract drilling company based in Alice, Texas, and renamed the company Blocker Energy.

In 1980, the company became a public company via an initial public offering.

In 1981 and early 1982, the company borrowed heavily to expand its fleet to 54 rigs.

However, in late 1982, the price of oil plunged and, to avoid bankruptcy, Blocker Energy restructured, giving 64% of the company to its banks in exchange for $240 million in debt forgiveness. By 1983, the company was only operating 6 rigs, although that number increased to 24 in 1984. By 1985, the worldwide employee count of the company was down to 500.

Richard Rainwater's BEC Ventures made an investment in the company in 1986 and chose Carl F. Thorne to run the company, which he did until his retirement 20 years later.

In 1987, the company changed its name to Energy Service Company (Ensco).

In 1990, in a transaction orchestrated by Rainwater, who owned 21% of the company, the company acquired Penrod, previously controlled by Ray Lee Hunt, which added 19 rigs to its fleet.

In 2010, the company moved its headquarters to London and became a UK-registered company.

In May 2011, the company acquired Pride International. The company closed its Dallas office and consolidated it into its Houston office.

In 2019, the company merged with Rowan Companies and changed its name to Valaris plc.

In August 2020, the company filed for a prearranged bankruptcy. It emerged from bankruptcy in May 2021.

See also
 ENSCO floating platforms 8500 and 8501
 List of oilfield service companies

References

External links

1975 establishments in Texas
1980s initial public offerings
Companies based in the City of Westminster
Companies listed on the New York Stock Exchange
Companies that filed for Chapter 11 bankruptcy in 2020
Drilling rig operators
Service companies of the United Kingdom
Tax inversions
Companies traded over-the-counter in the United States